Gail Marie Bradbrook (born 30 April 1972) is a British environmental activist and a co-founder of the environmental social movement Extinction Rebellion.

Early life and career
Bradbrook was born in 1972 and grew up in South Elmsall in West Yorkshire. Her father worked at a mine in South Kirkby. She studied molecular biophysics at the University of Manchester, gaining a PhD. She carried out post-doctoral work in India and France.

From 2003 to 2017 she was 'director of strategy' at Citizens Online, an organisation promoting wider internet access for disabled users, including launching a 'Fix the Web' campaign in November 2010.

Activism
An interest in animal rights led Bradbrook to join the Green Party at the age of 14.

She has been involved in various campaigning groups in Stroud, including a 2010 to 2013 period as voluntary director of Transition Stroud, an anti-fracking protest, various actions in opposition to the building of a local incinerator, including a naked protest, and an early Extinction Rebellion roadblock in Merrywalks, Stroud. In 2015, with George Barda, she set up the group Compassionate Revolution (which morphed into Rising Up!, out of which came Extinction Rebellion). "Bradbrook had been involved in the Occupy movement and campaigns around peak oil, but they failed to take off." 

In 2016, she went on a psychedelic retreat to Costa Rica, "where she took ayahuasca, iboga and kambo, in search of some clarity in her work." That experience "made her change her approach" to campaigning. Soon after returning she met Roger Hallam and together they came up with Extinction Rebellion.

Bradbrook wants to raise awareness of the dangers from anthropogenic climate change and believes that only civil disobedience on a large scale can bring about the change that is needed.

In November 2020 she was included in the BBC Radio 4 Woman's Hour Power list 2020.

In August 2021, Bradbrook acknowledged that she drives a diesel car. Citing a lack of suitable public transport and the high cost of electric vehicles, Bradbrook stated that she needed the vehicle to drive her children to sports matches.

Personal life
Bradbrook has been married twice, the first time to Jeffrey Forshaw. She has two sons. She lives in Stroud as does her ex-partner Simon Bramwell, who is also a co-founder of Extinction Rebellion.

Bibliography

References

External links
 Compassionate revolution – Gail Bradbrook – Off grid Festival 2016 – YouTube video by PermanentCultureNow
 Rising Up! How Things Change: The Duty to Disobey – Dr Gail Bradbrook speaks at SOAS University, March 2017 – YouTube video by ExtinctionRebellion

1972 births
Living people
People from South Elmsall
British environmentalists
Alumni of the University of Manchester Institute of Science and Technology
Climate activists
Extinction Rebellion
People from Hemsworth
English molecular biologists
Women molecular biologists
20th-century English scientists
21st-century English scientists